The Wonderful World of Wreckless Eric is the second album by  Wreckless Eric. It was released on October 13, 1978, as black vinyl LP (SEEZ 9), green vinyl LP (SEEZ 9), and picture disc LP (SEEZP 9).

Production
The album was produced by Pete Solley.

Album cover
The cover features Eric and others wearing Lloyd Johnson suits, including then-NME journalist Danny Baker at the drum kit.

Critical reception
Trouser Press wrote that "a balance is struck between Eric’s innate looseness and the clarity and sheer musicality needed to adequately present his tunes. As a result, The Wonderful World is a rollicking good time, propelled by Eric’s trademark guitar chug." Dave Thompson called the songs "stronger" than those on the debut, acknowledging that "a more polished sound and delivery left [the album] feeling less immediate." The Rough Guide to Rock wrote that the album develops Eric's "patent hybrid of punk and pop with a 50s sensibility."

Track listing
All compositions by Wreckless Eric; except where indicated
Side 1
"Walking On The Surface of the Moon"
"Take The Cash"
"Dizzy" (Freddy Weller, Tommy Roe)
"Veronica"
"Roll Over Rock-Ola"
Side 2
"I Wish It Would Rain"
"The Final Taxi"
"Let's Go to the Pictures"
"Girlfriend"
"Crying, Waiting, Hoping" (Buddy Holly)

Personnel
Wreckless Eric - vocals
Malcolm Morley - electric & acoustic guitar
Eunan Brady - electric guitar
John Brown - electric bass guitar
Geir Waade - drums
Pete Solley - keyboards, producer
with:
Jo Partridge - electric guitar solos on "Dizzy", "Veronica", "Roll Over Rock-Ola" and "I Wish It Would Rain"; Spanish guitar solo on "Crying, Waiting, Hoping"
Dick Hanson, John Earle - brass on "Dizzy"
Choir of The Latter Day Church of Non-Believers - choir on "Dizzy" and "The Final Taxi"
Gary Taylor - bass voice choir on "Crying, Waiting, Hoping"

References

External links
Official Wreckless Eric website

Wreckless Eric albums
1978 albums
Stiff Records albums